Natasha V. Raikhel (born 1947) is a professor of plant cell biology at University of California, Riverside and a member of the National Academy of Sciences.

Early life and education
Raikhel, the daughter of a surgeon and an X-Ray technician, grew up in Leningrad in the Soviet Union. From a young age, she was cultivated to become a concert pianist, until a teacher dissuaded her during her final year of high school from pursuing music as a career.  After transferring to a regular high school from the music conservatory, she studied various sciences day and night, finally earning high enough scores to attend Leningrad State University to study invertebrae biology.  Raiklhel graduated in 1970 with her master's degree and went on to receive her Ph.D from the Russian Academy of Sciences in 1975.

Immigrating to America 
In 1978, she, her husband, and their son survived a deadly plane crash—which the airline refused to acknowledge had even taken place.  The incident, alongside the death of her father and regular anti-Semitic encounters, convinced the couple to take their son abroad rather than to continue to live in the Soviet Union.  Due to their Jewish heritage, they obtained permission to emigrate shortly before the Soviet border closed for the last time concurrent with the Soviet invasion of Afghanistan. With the help of University of Georgia professor Jerome Paulin, who had temporarily worked alongside Raikhel in Leningrad in the late 1970s, Raikhel and her family emigrated to Rome and then to Georgia in 1979 as political refugees.

Education career 
Shortly after arriving Raikhel started her post-doctoral work at University of Georgia, concluding in 1984 when she was hired by the University as an assistant research scientist in their botany department. Beginning in 1986, she taught at Michigan State University's East Lansing campus as an assistant professor of botany. She was advanced to full professor in 1994. In 1996 Raikhel was awarded a Guggenheim fellowship for the study of plant sciences. She has done research related to SNARE proteins in plants, an understudied area, including Zheng et al 1999 in which she and her team found AtVTI1a to be essential to Golgi⇄vacuole trafficking. In 2001, the Raikhel family moved to University of California, Riverside (UCR) where she teaches plant cell biology. In 2012 Raikhel was elected to the National Academy of Sciences for "pioneering the use of novel genetic and biochemical techniques to elucidate the organization and function of the secretory system in plant cells."  She holds the Ernst and Helen Leibacher Endowed Chair in Plant Molecular, Cell Biology & Genetics at UCR. She is the founding director of UCR's Center for Plant Cell Biology and the current director of UCR's Institute for Integrative Genome Biology.

Personal life
She is an old and intimate friend of Susan R. Wessler. In 1989, she was diagnosed with breast cancer and received treatment for eight years before the cancer went into remission.

Published works

References

External links
 
 
 
 

1947 births
Living people
Russian women botanists
Soviet biologists
American women botanists
Jewish biologists
20th-century American women scientists
21st-century American women scientists
University of California, Riverside faculty
Saint Petersburg State University alumni
Proceedings of the National Academy of Sciences of the United States of America editors
Fellows of the American Association for the Advancement of Science
Members of the United States National Academy of Sciences